Sayaxché is a municipality in the El Petén department of Guatemala, on the Río La Pasión river.

The city was founded in 1874 to provide accommodation for forest workers of Jamet Sastré logging company. It obtained municipal status in 1929.

El Rosario National Park is located just east of the town. The archaeological sites of Ceibal and Dos Pilas are located within the municipal boundaries.

Climate
Sayaxché has a tropical monsoon climate (Köppen: Am).

African oil palm 

There is a large demand within Guatemala and some of its neighbors for edible oils and fats, which would explain how the African oil palm became so prevalent in the country in detriment of other oils, and which has allowed new companies associated to large capitalists into a new investment phase that can be found particularly over some territories within the Northern Transversal Strip of Guatemala. The investors are trying to turn Guatemala into one of the main palm oil exporters, in spite of the decline on its international price.  The most active region is found in Chisec and Cobán, in Alta Verapaz Department; Ixcán in Quiché Department, and Sayaxché, Petén Department, where Palmas del Ixcán, S.A. (PALIX) is located, both with its own plantation and those of subcontractors. Another active region is that of Fray Bartolomé de las Casas and Chahal in Alta Verapaz Department; El Estor and Livingston, Izabal Department; and San Luis, Petén, where Naturaceites operates.

Archeological sites 
Sayaxché has thirty two archeological locations; among the most visited are: El Ceibal, Dos Pilas and El Duende, Aguateca, and Cancuén.

Tourism

Sayaxché is at the tourism center of Petén Department.  The closest tourist attractions to the municipality are:

Ecological disaster 
On June 6, 2015, residents around Río La Pasión River reported the finding of a high count of dead fish floating along the river.

On June 11, 2015, Guatemala's authorities inspected palm oil extracting company "Reforestadora de Palmas de Petén, S.A." (REPSA), located in Sayaxché, and found traces Malathion in the company's tributaries leading to Río La Pasión river.

Tranquilino Xojalaj, administrator of REPSA declared that heavy rain caused the treatment wells to flood into the river, however the company is denying any involvement in the disaster, stating that they do not use Malathion as pesticide.

As of June 15, 2015, contamination has extended to over 105 km downstream and is affecting over 5,600 families (around 30,000 residents) from 16 communities by the riverside. These communities are dependable on the river's water supply and also for their fishing activities.

The pollution is threatening to extend to the Usumacinta River, which travels all the way to México, and may continue its way towards rivers in Tabasco.

Geographic location

See also

 African oil palm
 Franja Transversal del Norte
 Malation
 Pasión River
 Usumacinta river

Notes and references

Notes

References

Bibliography

External links
 Municipal website

Municipalities of the Petén Department